Megalocentor echthrus is a species of catfish (order Siluriformes) of the family Trichomycteridae, and the only species of the genus Megalocentor. This fish grows to about 8.8 centimetres (3.5 in) SL and originates from the Amazon and Orinoco basins.

References

Trichomycteridae
Fish described in 1991
Fish of South America
Fish of Bolivia
Fish of Brazil
Fish of Peru
Fish of Venezuela
Fish of the Amazon basin
Monotypic fish genera